Stefanidovka is a rural locality (a selo) in Solodchinskoye Rural Settlement, Olkhovsky District, Volgograd Oblast, Russia. The population was 120 as of 2010. There are 2 streets.

Geography 
Stefanidovka is located in steppe, on the Volga Upland, on the right bank of the Ilovlya River, 38 km southwest of Olkhovka (the district's administrative centre) by road. Solodcha is the nearest rural locality.

References 

Rural localities in Olkhovsky District
Tsaritsynsky Uyezd